The Diocese of El Paso is a Latin Church ecclesiastical territory or diocese of the Catholic Church in West Texas. Covering , it encompasses the Texas counties of El Paso, Brewster, Culberson, Hudspeth, Jeff Davis, Loving, Presidio, Reeves, Ward and Winkler with approximately 668,000 professing members, being 80.8% of the total population, served by 107 priests, 54 parishes and 237 male and female religious. The see is a suffragan of the Archdiocese of San Antonio.

The present boundaries of the diocese were established on 17 August 1982 when the New Mexico portion of the diocese was split off to form part of the newly created Diocese of Las Cruces. The Diocese of El Paso is a suffragan diocese in the ecclesiastical province of the metropolitan Archdiocese of San Antonio.

History

Before the founding of the diocese
Originally, the present-day area of El Paso was under the jurisdiction of the Diocese of Mexico which was established on 2 September 1530 by Pope Clement VII and included all of the territory of New Spain. On 13 July 1548 Pope Paul III erected the Diocese of Guadalajara, which included the northern frontier of New Spain. In 1620 Pope Paul V established the Diocese of Durango which encompassed all of the provinces of Nueva Vizcaya and Santa Fe de Nuevo México. In El Paso's present-day Mission Valley, Spanish missionaries established Mission Corpus Christi de la Isleta del Sur in 1682 and Mission Nuestra Señora de la Limpia Concepción de Los Piros de Socorro del Sur in 1682. In the 1770s the Presidio Chapel of San Elizario was established.  These mission churches function to this day as parishes of the diocese and are among the oldest churches in the United States.

As a result of the Mexican–American War (1846–1848), the region became part of the United States, splitting from the Diocese of Durango, and on 23 July 1850 the Vicariate Apostolic of New Mexico was established, which on 29 July 1853 became the Diocese of Santa Fe under Bishop John Baptist Lamy, encompassing West Texas and New Mexico Territory, which at the time included the present-day states of New Mexico and Arizona. San José de Concordia el Alto was erected in 1859 on the site of the present Concordia Cemetery. It was the nearest Catholic church for El Paso residents at the time. There was no Catholic church in El Paso proper before 1881. Often Catholics from El Paso boarded a hand-pulled ferry to attend mass at Our Lady of Guadalupe in Juárez.

When the see of Santa Fe was elevated to an archdiocese, the El Paso area was transferred to the newly created Vicariate Apostolic of Arizona in 1868. In the 1880s the new railroad lines in El Paso created a population boom and in 1882 lots were purchased on North Oregon Street as a site for the first Catholic church in El Paso, known as St. Mary's or Holy Family, which was completed in November 1882. In 1891 the El Paso area was transferred to the newly created Diocese of Dallas. St. Mary's School was opened for Catholic children in 1903. The earliest school of the Sisters of Loretto, Loretto Academy, dates from 1879 in San Elizario and, after moving to El Paso in 1892, continues to operate to the present day. Hotel Dieu, a hospital opened in 1892, operated for many decades. During the Mexican Revolution there was an influx of Catholics from Mexico into the El Paso area.  To address the needs of the growing Catholic community, Jesuit priest Carlos Pinto established several new parishes in El Paso.  These included Sacred Heart, Immaculate Conception, St. Ignatius, Guardian Angel, and Holy Family parishes.  Rural areas in southern New Mexico and west Texas were served by travelling priests in car and horseback. After Pinto's efforts, Catholic parishes began to flourish in El Paso.

Founding and early history
On 3 March 1914, Pope Pius X established the Diocese of El Paso as a suffragan see of Santa Fe. Jesuit priest Father John J. Brown was appointed bishop of the newly created diocese on 22 January 1915 but resigned before his scheduled consecration. On 17 June 1915, another Jesuit, Father Anthony Joseph Schuler, was appointed bishop and was consecrated on 28 October 1915 by John Baptist Pitaval, the Archbishop of Santa Fe. Bishop Schuler oversaw the construction of St. Patrick's Cathedral. In raising funds for the cathedral's construction, the diocese offered to allow the first group to raise $10,000 for the project to name the new cathedral. A group of Irish Catholic women met the challenge and chose St. Patrick as patron. At the time El Paso was a major center of the mining industry in the southwestern United States and northern Mexico, with many of the miners being Irish.

The anti-clerical Mexican Constitution of 1917 and the persecution of the Catholic Church under Mexican presidents Venustiano Carranza and Plutarco Elías Calles resulted in an influx of priests and religious crossing back and forth between El Paso and Juárez to serve the needs of Catholics in Mexico during the Cristero War. Bishop Schuler ordained Father Pedro de Jesus Maldonado Lucero, from Chihuahua City, in St. Patrick Cathedral in 1918 to serve the needs of the faithful in the state of Chihuahua. Fr Maldonado was beaten to death in Santa Isabel, Chihuahua by town authorities in 1937 and was raised to sainthood as one of the Saints of the Cristero War canonised by Pope John Paul II in 2000. A memorial commemorating the ordination of St. Peter of Jesus Maldonado was erected in St. Patrick Cathedral in 2005.

In 1924, Bishop Schuler opened St. Charles Borromeo Seminary and Cathedral High School. In 1939 Urbici Soler y Manonelles completed the Shrine of Cristo Rey on the mountain where the borders of New Mexico, Texas and Chihuahua meet. The massive statue of Christ the King looks out over three states in two nations.

On 26 November 1941 Pope Pius XII appointed Sidney Matthew Metzger, then Auxiliary Bishop of Santa Fe, coadjutor bishop of El Paso.  On 29 November 1942, Bishop Schuler retired and Metzger succeeded as bishop of El Paso.  During the first few years of his term, with the help of the Catholic Church Extension Society, Metzger travelled the United States making his appeal from the pulpit for funds to erect new apostolates needed by the diocese. His success was evident in the continuing establishment of Catholic ministries and institutions. Metzger built the current St. Charles Borromeo Seminary, two Catholic youth organisation camps in the New Mexico mountains, Holy Cross Retreat near Las Cruces. On 16 October 1961 the eastern portion of the diocese was carved out to form part of the newly erected Diocese of San Angelo. In the early 1960s, Bishop Metzger was called to Rome to attend the Second Vatican Council.  Metzger oversaw the implementation of the Council's decrees in the diocese.  Metzger was also a strong advocate for social justice issues such as the rights of the working people to collective bargaining. In 1972 more than 3,000 employees of Farah Manufacturing Company in El Paso went on a strike lasting 20 months.  Metzger gained national attention for his advocacy on behalf of the workers. At the time Metzger said, "I feel that the company is acting unjustly in denying to the workers the basic right to collective bargaining." William Farah, the company's president, subsequently called Metzger a member of the "rotten old bourgeoisie" and a man who is "lolling in wealth".

On Saint Patrick's Day, 1978, Metzger retired and on 4 April 1978 Patrick Flores, Auxiliary Bishop of San Antonio, was appointed by Pope Paul VI to succeed him.  Flores was installed on 29 May 1978 and served just over a year before being appointed Archbishop of San Antonio.

On 29 April 1980, Raymundo Joseph Peña, Auxiliary Bishop of San Antonio, was appointed bishop of El Paso and was installed on 18 June 1980.  Continuing in Bishop Metzger's footsteps, Peña continued work for issues of social justice in the diocese taking up the cause the undocumented immigrants. Peña called for a middle ground in the blockade against the undocumented during the mid-1990s. He also established Tepeyac Institute to prepare members of the laity for many ministries within the diocese. On 17 August 1982 the portion of the diocese in southern New Mexico was carved out to form part of the newly formed Diocese of Las Cruces; the Diocese of El Paso. which as a result was in Texas only, became part of the Province of San Antonio.

Present day
On 23 May 1994 Bishop Peña was transferred to the Diocese of Brownsville and on 1 April 1996 Pope John Paul II appointed then Auxiliary Bishop of Los Angeles Armando Xavier Ochoa as bishop of El Paso and he was installed on 26 June 1996. Ochoa has encouraged vocations to the priesthood and religious life, and the strengthening of diocesan ministries. In 1999 the diocese began a cooperative program with the Archdiocese of Atlanta for preparing seminarians from that area for ministry to the growing Hispanic population in the southern United States. In 2001 the diocese entered into a pact of solidarity with the dioceses of Choluteca, Tegucigalpa, and Brownsville, Texas, in response to the devastation caused in Central America in 1998 by Hurricane Mitch. In 2004, Ochoa established the Committee on a Five-Year Plan for Vocations and a Committee on the Life and Ministry of Priests. He initiated the annual Diocesan Congresses which enable the faithful to enrich their knowledge of the faith and commitment to ministry.

On 1 December 2011 Pope Benedict XVI appointed Ochoa as bishop of the Diocese of Fresno, California. On 6 May 2013, Pope Francis appointed Mark J. Seitz, auxiliary bishop of the Diocese of Dallas, to succeed Ochoa.

Sexual abuse cases

On January 31, 2019, the Diocese of El Paso released the names of 30 Catholic clergy who were "credibly accused" of committing acts of sexual abuse while serving in the Diocese. On May 6, 2020, the Diocese of El Paso and its St. Jude's and Immaculate Conception parishes, located in Alamogordo, were named in a sexual abuse lawsuit stemming from alleged abuse committed by David Holley. The plaintiff, identified as "John Doe," accused the Diocese of El Paso of protecting David Holley after Holley sexually abused him in the 1970s. The plaintiff alleged assault and battery as well as sexual assault and child pornography.

On August 4, 2020, the Diocese of El Paso was named in a sexual abuse lawsuit involving a plaintiff identified as "Jane Doe," for alleged sex abuse committed by Damian Gamboa at the St. Francis de Paula Church in Tularosa, New Mexico in the early 1980s. The New Mexico church was later transferred to the Diocese of Las Cruces, which was also named as a defendant in the lawsuit as well.

Bishops

Bishops of El Paso
 Anthony Joseph Schuler, S.J. (1915-1942)
 Sidney Matthew Metzger (1942-1978)
 Patrick Fernandez Flores (1978-1979), appointed Archbishop of San Antonio
 Raymundo Joseph Peña (1980-1994), appointed Bishop of Brownsville
 Armando Xavier Ochoa (1996-2011), appointed Bishop of Fresno
 Mark Joseph Seitz (2013–present)
(John J. Brown, S.J. was appointed in 1915; did not take effect.)

Coadjutor Bishop
 Sidney Matthew Metzger (1941-1942)

Auxiliary Bishops
 Anthony Cerdan Celino (Elect, 2023)

Education
 High Schools
 Cathedral High School, El Paso
 Father Yermo High School, El Paso
 Loretto Academy, El Paso

See also

 Cathedral Parish of Saint Patrick in El Paso
 Catholic Church by country
 Catholic Church in the United States
 Cristero War
 Ecclesiastical Province of San Antonio
 Global organisation of the Catholic Church
 List of Roman Catholic archdioceses (by country and continent)
 List of Roman Catholic dioceses (alphabetical) (including archdioceses)
 List of Roman Catholic dioceses (structured view) (including archdioceses)
 List of the Catholic dioceses of the United States
 Urbici Soler y Manonelles

References

External links 
Roman Catholic Diocese of El Paso Official Site
Diocese of El Paso Catholic Schools 

 
Christian organizations established in 1914
El Paso
Irish-American history and culture in Texas
El Paso